Irene Forbes (3 April 1949 – 14 June 2014) was a Cuban fencer. She competed in the women's team foil event at the 1972 Summer Olympics.

References

1949 births
2014 deaths
Sportspeople from Havana
Cuban female foil fencers
Olympic fencers of Cuba
Fencers at the 1972 Summer Olympics
Place of death missing
Pan American Games medalists in fencing
Pan American Games bronze medalists for Cuba
Pan American Games silver medalists for Cuba
Fencers at the 1971 Pan American Games
20th-century Cuban women
20th-century Cuban people
21st-century Cuban women